Grandview is a city in Yakima County, Washington, United States. It is about 38 miles west of Kennewick and 38 miles southeast of Yakima. The population was 10,907 at the 2020 census. Grandview's economy is agriculture based; with apples, cherries, concord and wine grapes, hops, asparagus, corn, wheat, dairy and other fruit and vegetable production supported by processing plants and cold storage facilities.

History
Grandview received its name in 1906 due to its view of Mount Rainier and Mount Adams. Grandview was officially incorporated on September 21, 1909. It began simply as the halfway point on the rail line between Prosser and Sunnyside.

Geography
Grandview is located at  (46.253670, -119.910133).

Demographics

2010 census
As of the census of 2010, there were 10,862 people, 2,996 households, and 2,459 families living in the city. The racial makeup of the city was 55.2% White, 0.9% African American, 0.6% Native American, 0.5% Asian, 0.1% Pacific Islander, 38.8% from other races, and 4.0% from two or more races. Hispanic or Latino of any race were 79.7% of the population.

There were 2,996 households, of which 57.1% had children under the age of 18 living with them, 54.5% were married couples living together, 18.5% had a female householder with no husband present, 9.0% had a male householder with no wife present, and 17.9% were non-families. 14.2% of all households were made up of individuals, and 5.6% had someone living alone who was 65 years of age or older. The average household size was 3.60 and the average family size was 3.90.

The median age in the city was 26.3 years. 37% of residents were under the age of 18; 11.2% were between the ages of 18 and 24; 26.8% were from 25 to 44; 17.1% were from 45 to 64; and 7.9% were 65 years of age or older. The gender makeup of the city was 50.0% male and 50.0% female.

2000 census
As of the census of 2000, there were 8,377 people, 2,431 households, and 1,956 families living in the city. The population density was 1,552.3 people per square mile (599.0/km2). There were 2,581 housing units at an average density of 478.3 per square mile (184.5/km2). The racial makeup of the city was 51.12% White, 0.58% African American, 0.94% Native American, 0.94% Asian, 0.11% Pacific Islander, 43.27% from other races, and 3.03% from two or more races. Hispanic or Latino of any race were 68.04% of the population.

There were 2,431 households, out of which 49.9% had children under the age of 18 living with them, 60.0% were married couples living together, 14.6% had a female householder with no husband present, and 19.5% were non-families. 16.6% of all households were made up of individuals, and 7.8% had someone living alone who was 65 years of age or older. The average household size was 3.40 and the average family size was 3.80.

In the city, the age distribution of the population shows 36.2% under the age of 18, 11.3% from 18 to 24, 27.0% from 25 to 44, 16.1% from 45 to 64, and 9.4% who were 65 years of age or older. The median age was 27 years. For every 100 females, there were 98.5 males. For every 100 females age 18 and over, there were 96.6 males.

The median income for a household in the city was $32,588, and the median income for a family was $36,165. Males had a median income of $29,321 versus $21,959 for females. The per capita income for the city was $12,489. About 16.0% of families and 20.3% of the population were below the poverty line, including 26.0% of those under age 18 and 17.6% of those age 65 or over.

Notable people
 Lorena González, Seattle city councilmember
 Margaret Rayburn, educator and member of the Washington House of Representatives
 Janet Waldo, voice-over actress

Major highways
 Interstate 82

References

External links
 City of Grandview
 Grandview Heritage

Cities in Washington (state)
Cities in Yakima County, Washington
Populated places on the Yakima River